Meinong's jungle is the name given by Richard Routley (1980) to the repository of non-existent objects in the ontology of Alexius Meinong.

Overview
Meinong, an Austrian philosopher active at the turn of the 20th century, believed that since non-existent things could apparently be referred to, they must have some sort of being, which he termed sosein ("being so"). A unicorn and a pegasus are both non-being; yet it's true that unicorns have horns and pegasi have wings. Thus non-existent things like unicorns, square circles, and golden mountains can have different properties, and must have a 'being such-and-such' even though they lack 'being' proper. The strangeness of such entities led to this ontological realm being referred to as "Meinong's jungle". The jungle is described in Meinong's work Über Annahmen (1902). The name is credited to William C. Kneale, whose Probability and Induction (1949) includes the passage "after wandering in Meinong's jungle of subsistence ... philosophers are now agreed that propositions cannot be regarded as ultimate entities".

The Meinongian theory of objects (Gegenstandstheorie) was influential in the debate over sense and reference between Gottlob Frege and Bertrand Russell which led to the establishment of analytic philosophy and contemporary philosophy of language. Russell's theory of descriptions, in the words of P. M. S. Hacker, enables him to "thin out the luxuriant Meinongian jungle of entities (such as the round square), which, it had appeared, must in some sense subsist in order to be talked about". According to the theory of descriptions, speakers are not committed to asserting the existence of referents for the names they use.

Meinong's jungle is cited as an objection to Meinong's semantics, as the latter commits one to ontically undesirable objects; it is desirable to be able to speak meaningfully about unicorns, the objection goes, but not to have to believe in them. Nominalists (who believe that general or abstract terms and predicates exist but that either universals or abstract objects do not) find Meinong's jungle particularly unpalatable. As Colin McGinn puts it, "[g]oing naively by the linguistic appearances leads not only to logical impasse but also to metaphysical extravagance—as with Meinong's jungle, infested with shadowy Being." An uneasiness with the ontological commitments of Meinong's theory is commonly expressed in the bon mot "we should cut back Meinong's jungle with Occam's razor".

Meinong's jungle was defended by modal realists, whose possible world semantics offered a more palatable variation of Meinong's Gegenstandstheorie, as Jaakko Hintikka explains:

However, modal realists retain the problem of explaining reference to impossible objects such as square circles. For Meinong, such objects simply have a 'being so' that precludes their having ordinary 'being'. But this entails that 'being so' in Meinong's sense is not equivalent to existing in a possible world.

See also 
Abstract object theory
Empty name, a name without a referent
Extended modal realism
Fictionalism, a theory which holds that one can talk about fictional objects without being committed to their existence
Modal realism
Noneism, the philosophical belief that there are things that do not exist
Plato's beard

References

Sources

External links 

Ontology
Abstract object theory
Metaphysical realism
Concepts in metaphysics